Daniel Franklin Lafean (February 7, 1861 – April 18, 1922) was a Republican member of the U.S. House of Representatives from Pennsylvania.

Biography
Lafean was born in York, Pennsylvania to German immigrants from Posen.  He was engaged in candy manufacturing and in banking in York. He served as a director of the Gettysburg College and trustee of the Gettysburg Seminary in Gettysburg, Pennsylvania. He was the first president of the American Caramel Company and was later a co-founder and president of the Keystone Color Works. He was a Freemason and served as Worshipful Master of his lodge, Zeredatha Lodge No. 451, York, in 1895.

Lafean was elected as a Republican to the Fifty-eighth and to the four succeeding Congresses. He was an unsuccessful candidate for reelection in 1912. He was elected to the Sixty-fourth Congress, but was not a candidate for renomination in 1916. He was appointed commissioner of banking of the State of Pennsylvania in 1917. He again engaged in manufacturing pursuits and died in Philadelphia, Pennsylvania. He was interred in Prospect Hill Cemetery in York, Pennsylvania.

Sources

The Political Graveyard
Lafean and York Fair of 100-Years-Ago – York Daily Record (Sep. 16, 2016)
Zeredatha-White Rose Lodge No. 451, F.&A.M.

References

External links
 

1861 births
1922 deaths
American bankers
American people of German descent
Businesspeople from Pennsylvania
Businesspeople in confectionery
Gettysburg College
Politicians from York, Pennsylvania
Republican Party members of the United States House of Representatives from Pennsylvania